Caught on Camera is a British documentary series, which looks at real-life footage, filmed by members of the public.

The cameras used to film this footage, such as CCTV, smartphones, bodycams and dashcams, are everywhere in the United Kingdom, capturing many traditional British events, such as angry moments, car incidents, heroes holding their own against criminals, etc.

Caught on Camera also interviews those involved, regarding these events, including those who are the victims and the heroes, whilst mentioning the results of the events.

Episodes

References

2009 British television series debuts
ITV (TV network) original programming
Television shows set in the United Kingdom